They Got Lost is a rarities compilation album by the group They Might Be Giants. It was issued in 2002 (see 2002 in music) in the United States and 2005 in the United Kingdom.  It was available through online order several years before it went into general release.

Five tracks were previously released on the 1999 eMusic compilation album Long Tall Weekend, while four others are culled from the Working Undercover for the Man EP.  Several tracks were previously featured on the band's Dial-A-Song service and its associated website, as well as the band's TMBG Unlimited mp3 subscription service.  Others were produced for various side projects, such as ABC's Nightline in Primetime TV mini-series Brave New World ("All Alone", a sea shanty-like song about a bacterium transported to the Moon by Surveyor 3); a special edition of McSweeney's Quarterly Concern ("Theme from McSweeney's"); and the radio show This American Life ("I'm Sick (of This American Life)"). The title song previously appeared on the live album Severe Tire Damage (with a more uptempo rock arrangement) and Long Tall Weekend.

This collection marks the third official release of the brief "Token Back to Brooklyn," first issued as a hidden track on the 1996 album Factory Showroom and reissued on Long Tall Weekend.

Reception

Allmusic called the compilation "a collection of truly rare rarities, it shows once again that the group's more obscure songs are quite often just as great as their best-known ones." They particularly praised the silliness of many of the tunes, and the interesting notes on their backgrounds.

Track listing
All songs by They Might Be Giants unless otherwise noted.

References

External links
They Got Lost at This Might Be A Wiki

Self-released albums
They Might Be Giants compilation albums
2002 compilation albums
Albums produced by Pat Dillett
Idlewild Recordings compilation albums
Zoë Records compilation albums